Tamara Obrovac (born 1962 in Pula), Croatian singer, composer, songwriter  and flutist is one of the most impressive artists on the Croatian music scene, her main expression is ethnically inspired contemporary jazz influenced by the particular musical and dialect traditions of her homeland, the Croatian peninsula of Istria.

Biography 

She started her musical career in Zagreb in the 1980s, when she discovered jazz, having graduated in flute performance at the music school in her native Pula. She began to perform in clubs in Croatia and Slovenia, and soon created her own distinctive musical expression, connecting the musical and dialectal tradition of her native Istria with jazz music, which brought her international recognition.

She has written around 200 compositions, published 13 CDs for which she composed all the music and wrote most of the lyrics. She writes lyrics in her local dialect and sings in other ancient and endangered Istrian dialects, of Slavic and Romance origin.
Since her early career in the 1980s, she has formed and led several international bands (Transhistria ensemble, quartet, etc.) and held more than 500 international concerts. She was highly praised by both the audience and press.
Her performances are marked by her charismatic stage energy, expressive voice and improvisational skills, as well as excellent performances by the bands.

In addition to her concert activities, she composes music for theater and film; she composed music for 10 movies, 40 theater plays and ballets, performed in most national and city theaters in Croatia and in the region. Unlike her main musical expression, in which she blends Istrian tradition and contemporary jazz, her stage and film music work is unlimited in genre.

She has received numerous awards for her work, among others: 9 Porin awards (Croatian national music award), she was the first woman who received the national award Golden Arena for the best film score (for Što je muškarac bez brkova at the Pula Film Festival), also, among many other nominations, she was nominated for the BBC Radio 3 World Music Award (European music and Audience award).

Her many international collaborations and projects include, among others: Glauco Venier, Theodosii Spassov, Vlatko Stefanovski, Kostas Theodoru, Karen Asatrian, Wolfgang Puschnig, Simone Zanchini, Elvis Stanić, Dario Marušić, Miroslav Tadić, Epoque string quartet, Vienna Radio String Quartet Vienna and enjoys long term collaborations (band members) with Fausto Beccalossi, Krunoslav Levačić, Uroš Rakovec, Žiga Golob, Matija Dedić and, recently, Salvatore Maiore and Stefano Battaglia.

Discography 

 1996: “Triade” - Tamara Obrovac & trio (Croatian Composers Society)
 1998: “Ulika” - Tamara Obrovac quartet (CBS)
 2001: “Transhistria” - Tamara Obrovac Transhistria ensemble (Cantus)
 2003: “Sve pasiva / All fades away” - Tamara Obrovac Transhistria ensemble (Cantus)
 2005: “Daleko je…/ … is faraway” - Tamara Obrovac Transhistria ensemble Aquarius Records
 2006: “Črni kos / Das Led der Amsel” - Tamara Obrovac & Georg Kustrich (Extraplatte)
 2009: “Neću više jazz kantati / I Won’t Sing Jazz Anymore” - Tamara Obrovac Transhistria electric Aquarius Records
 2011: “Madirosa” - Tamara Obrovac Transhistria ensemble / Époque Quartet (Cantus / Aquarius Records)
 2014: “Ulika revival” - Tamara Obrovac quartet (Unit records)
 2016: “Canto amoroso” - Tamara Obrovac Transhistria ensemble (Alessa Records)
 2018: “Live@ZKM” - Tamara Obrovac Transhistria ensemble (Cantus)
 2019: “TransAdriaticum” - Tamara Obrovac TransAdriatic quartet (Alessa Records)
 2020: “Villa Idola” - Tamara Obrovac Transhistria ensemble / Croatian Radiotelevision Jazz Orchestra Aquarius Records

Film scores 

 2003: “Stina” - Documentary film about famous Croatian painter Edo Murtić, directed by Rajko Grlić
 2003: “Metahead” - animation movie, Zagrebfilm, author Branko Farac 
 2003: “Ptice” - radio drama, Croatian National radio, directed by Jasna Mesarić
 2004: “Jasnovidka” - feature film, RTV Slovenia, directed by Biljana Čakić Veselič
 2004: “Ono sve što znaš o meni” - feature film, directed by Bobo Jelčić and Nataša Rajković
 2005:  What Is a Man Without a Moustache? - feature film, directed by Hrvoje Hribar
 2010: “Piran Pirano” - feature film, directed by Goran Vojnović
 2011: “Night boats”- feature film, directed by Igor Mirković
 2012: “Contrada” - short movie, directed by Matija Debeljuh
 2015: “Jure Grando” - animation movie, author Martin Babić
 2020: “Once were humans” - feature film, directed by Goran Vojnović

Theatre music 

 1998: “Non era la quinta, era la nona”, Istrian national Theatre Pula, directed by Robert Raponja	
 1999: “Manifestation of the Introvert”, En Knapp Production, Ljubljana, choreographer Maja Delak		
 2000: “The Little Mermaid”, Istrian national Theatre Pula, directed by Robert Raponja 		
 2001: “The Dance of the Dead”, Istrian National Theater Pula, the Musical Drama Fantasy, directed by Robert Raponja										
 2002: “Snow Queen”, City Theatre Žar ptica Zagreb, directed by Dora Ružđak			
 2002: “Christmas at the Ivanov's”, Zagreb Youth Theatre directed by Nebojša Borojević                               
 2004: “Dog, woman, man” Theatre Exit Zagreb, directed by Zijah Sokolović
 2004: “Vassa Zheleznova”, Croatian National Theatre Zagreb, directed by Zlatko Sviben                          
 2004: “Antigone” Croatian National Theater Split, directed by Matko Raguž
 2005: “Ekoteka”, A play for children, directed by Daska company, Sisak 	
 2006: “Udovice/Widows”, Croatian National Theatre in Split, directed by Dino Mustafić  			
 2006: “Zagrljenici / Embraced”, SARTR, Sarajevo War Theatre, directed by Robert Raponja			
 2006: “Titanic Orchestra”, Istrian National Theatre Pula, directed by Dino Mustafić			
 2007: “Zmaj koji je kokice jeo/ The dragon that ate the popcorn”, Split City Puppet Theatre, directed by Robi Waltl			
 2007: “The Cripple of Inishmaan”, Narodno Pozorište Sarajevo, directed by Dino Mustafić			
 2007: “Bakery Miš Maš”, The Slovenian Youth Theatre Ljubljana, directed by Robi Waltl			
 2007: “Empty Room in the Sun”, Istrian National Theatre Pula, directed by Aleksandra Mišić			
 2007: “Regoč”, Puppet Theatre Zadar, directed by Robi Waltl			
 2007: “Cruel and Tender”, Istrian National Theatre Pula, directed by Lawrence Kiiru			
 2008: “The Ugly Duckling”, Mini Theatre, Ljubljana, directed by Robert Waltl  			
 2008: “The Taming of the Shrew”, Croatian National Theatre in Rijeka, directed by Vito Taufer 	
 2008: “Tablica dijeljenja / Division table”, Istrian National Theatre Pula, directed by Ivan Leo Lemo     	
 2009: “Tomizziana”, Istrian National Theatre Pula, directed by Damir Zlatar Frei 			
 2009: “Svarožić”, (Slavic god), City Theatre of Puppets, Zagreb, directed by Krešimir Dolenčić	
 2009: “The Demon of Debar Maalo”, Little City Theatre „Off the Channel”, Sofia, Bulgaria, directed by Dino Mustafić				
 2011: “Passers-by”, Croatian National Theatre in Osijek, directed by Borna Baletić 			
 2013: “Silent Wedding (Nunta mută)”, Maribor Slovene National Theatre, directed by Dino Mustafić    	
 2014: “The dragon: a satiric fable in three acts”, Slovene National Theatre Nova Gorica, directed by Dino Mustafić  				
 2015: “My friend Mačkodlak”, Split City Puppet Theatre, directed by Ivan Plazibat 			
 2015: “Our Class”, Chamber Theater 55, Sarajevo, directed by Dino Mustafić			
 2016: “Vampire Chronicle Jure Grando”, Istrian National Theatre Pula, (songs), directed by Damir Zlatar Frei 				
 2016: “Men of Wax”, Croatian National Theatre in Zagreb, directed by Janusz Kica  				 
 2017: “Aziz, or The Wedding That Saved the West”, Croatian National Theatre Split, directed by Dino Mustafić	 			
 2017: “Dirty Špiro and naughty Tonka”, Split City Puppet Theatre, directed by Ivan Plazibat	 
 2017: “Apoxyiomenos”, ballet Croatian National Theatre in Zagreb / Théâtre de Liège choreographer Claudio Bernardo 			
 2018: “King Lear”, Croatian National Theatre in Zagreb, directed by Janusz Kica       		 
 2018: “Of Mice and Men” Barski ljetopis/City Theatre Podgorica, Montenegro, directed by Dino Mustafić 	
 2019: “Goldberg variations” Slovenian Permanent Theatre Triest, directed by Robert Waltl  	
 2020: “Sliparija” Istrian National Theatre Pula, directed by Matija Debeljuh

Awards 

 2002: The Croatian national theatrical award: best music in a theatrical work for the play “Tanac od mrtvih (The Dance of the Dead)” (Istrian National Theatre) 
 2003: The “Golden smile” award: best music and performance for the play “Jelka kod Ivanovih (Christmas at the Ivanov's)”(Zagreb Youth Theatre) 
 2003: Zlatna koogla award for best Croatian female artist 
 2004: Porin (Croatian national music award) for best world music album, CD “Sve pasiva/All fades away” 
 2004: Nominated for BBC Radio 3 Awards for World Music (European music and audience award categories)
 2005: Award for best music in a theatrical work for play “Antigone” @ Marulovi dani, Split 
 2006: Porin (Croatian national music award) for best female vocal performance, song “Daleko je...” / CD “Daleko je… is faraway”
 2006: Porin: (Croatian national music award) best world music album, for CD “Daleko je… is faraway”
 2006: Porin (Croatian national music award) for best vocal collaboration with Tedi Spalato, for song “Ti i ja”
 2006: Golden Arena award (Croatian national film festival, Pula): best score for Hrvoje Hribar’s film “Što je muskarac bez brkova (What is a man without a mustache)” 
 2007: best music in a theatrical work for the play “Zagrljenici”, National theatrical festival Bosnia and Herzegovina
 2007: Award for the best music in a theatrical work for the play “Zagrljenici”, 6th festival of Bosnian and Herzegovinian drama, Zenica
 2008: Porin (Croatian national music award) for best female vocal performance of 2008.
 2008: Award for best drama for its music at the festival Regoč Croatian Children’s drama festival
 2008: “Mali Marulić”, Croatian Children’s drama festival, Award for the music in the theatre show “Regoč” by Ivana Brlić Mažuranić, performed by the Zadar Puppet Theatre
 2009: President of the Republic of Croatia, the medal of the Order of Danica Hrvatska for outstanding achievements in culture
 2009: 42nd PIF – International Puppet Theater Festival, the International Professional Jury Award for the music in the theatre show “Svarožić”, performed by the Zagreb Puppet Theatre (Zagreb, Croatia)
 2009: Runjić’s evenings, Golden Seagull Award for the best remake of Runjić’s song “A vitar puše” awarded to Tamara Obrovac and Matija Dedić, Split 2009.
 2010: Porin (Croatian national music award) for best Club music album, for CD “Neću više jazz kantati / I won’t Sing Jazz Any More”
 2012: Porin (Croatian national music award) for best world music album for CD “Madirosa” 
 2012: Porin (Croatian national music award) for best female vocal performance, the song “Tango and cha cha cha” CD “Madirosa” 
 2013: professional jury award for best score for short film “Contrada”, director Matija Debeljuh, Croatian film days.
 2013: Croatian Composers Society award “Miroslav Sedak Benčić”, 2015, for best jazz author
 2017: International Small Scene Theatre Festival professional jury award for best music in the theatre show “Ljudi od voska”, performed by the Zagreb National Theatre (Rijeka, Croatia) 2017.
 2019: Porin (Croatian national music award) for best Jazz composition “Suza sjajna / A shiny tear”, from CD “TransAdriaticum”.

Performances (selection) 

Germany (Düsseldorf Jazz Rally, Jazzahead’13, Lüneburger Jazz-Night, Le gipfel du jazz Freiburg, Bayerisher Hof Munchen, Laboratorium Stuttgart, Eisenach Jazzclub, etc.), Norway (Trondheim Jazz Festival), China (Beijing Cultural Palace of the Nationalities, Chuama festival), Belgium (Bozar Brussels, The Music Village Brussels, Balkan Trafik Festival), Austria (Porgy & Bess Vienna, Akkordeon Fest Vienna, Jazz Festival Steyr, Glatt & Verkehrt Musikfestival, Jazz club Klagenfurt, Kunsthaus Weiz, etc.), Switzerland (RSI Lugano, Bird’s Eye Basel, Moods Zurich), Italy (Alpsklang Festival Merano, Talos Jazz Fest, Trieste Loves Jazz, Mittelfest, AnteprimaMundus Fest, etc.), USA (Joe’s Pub NYC, Hot House Chicago), France (Strictly mundial Festival Marseille, L’Entrepot Paris, Maritime Festival Brest), Spain (Circulo Jazz club Madrid, Festival Ribermusica Barcelona, La Fira Mediterrania de Manresa), Morocco (Jazz au Chellah Festival), Greece (Dimithriathess Festival Thessaloníki), Poland (Crossroads Festival Krakow), Latvia (Saulkrasti Jazz Fest, Riga Jazz Club), Lithuania (Vilnius Jazz Festival), Finland (EBU Festival Kaustinen), BiH (Sarajevo Jazz Fest), Slovenia (Cankarjev dom club, Druga godba Festival, etc.), Israel (Rishon le Zion Tel Aviv), Japan (Expo), Croatia (everywhere :), Russia, Slovakia, Bulgaria, Turkey, Ireland and many more.

References

External links 
 Official website   
 Official Youtube channel 
 Soundcloud 

1962 births
Living people
20th-century Croatian women singers
21st-century Croatian women singers
Golden Arena winners
People from Pula
Croatian film score composers